Mohammad Iqbal (born December 31, 1973) is a Pakistani born Canadian cricketer.

Iqbal started his career in Pakistan where he played with Rawalpindi. A right-handed opening batsman, he scored a century in his maiden first-class innings with Canada, against Namibia in 2007. He also made 88 in the second innings.

References

External links
Mohammad Iqbal on ESPN cricinfo
CricketArchive profile
Alternative CricketArchive profile
CricketArchive has two separate profiles for the same player.

1973 births
Living people
Canadian cricketers
Canada One Day International cricketers
Canada Twenty20 International cricketers
Rawalpindi cricketers
Pakistani emigrants to Canada
Naturalized citizens of Canada
Pakistani cricketers
Cricketers from Lahore
Canadian sportspeople of Pakistani descent